Italy competed at the 1952 Summer Olympics in Helsinki, Finland. 231 competitors, 208 men and 23 women, took part in 114 events in 19 sports.

Medalists

Gold
Pino Dordoni — Athletics, Men's 50 km Walk
Aureliano Bolognesi — Boxing, Men's Lightweight
Enzo Sacchi — Cycling, Men's 1.000m Sprint (Scratch) 
Loris Campana, Mino de Rossi, Guido Messina, and Marino Morettini — Cycling, Men's 4.000m Team Pursuit 
Edoardo Mangiarotti — Fencing, Men's Épée Individual 
Roberto Battaglia, Franco Bertinetti, Giuseppe Delfino, Dario Mangiarotti, Edoardo Mangiarotti, and Carlo Pavesi — Fencing, Men's Épée Team 
Irene Camber — Fencing, Women's Foil Individual
Nicolò Rode and Agostino Straulino — Sailing, Men's Star

Silver
Adolfo Consolini — Athletics, Men's Discus Throw
Sergio Caprari — Boxing, Men's Featherweight
Marino Morettini — Cycling, Men's 1.000m Time Trial 
Dino Bruni, Gianni Ghidini, and Vincenzo Zucconelli — Cycling, Men's Team Road Race 
Edoardo Mangiarotti — Fencing, Men's Foil Individual
Giancarlo Bergamini, Manlio di Rosa, Edoardo Mangiarotti, Renzo Nostini, Giorgio Pellini, and Antonio Spallino — Fencing, Men's Foil Team 
Dario Mangiarotti — Fencing, Men's Épée Individual
Gastone Darè, Roberto Ferrari, Renzo Nostini, Giorgio Pellini, Vincenzo Pinton, and Mauro Racca — Fencing, Men's Sabre Team 
Ignazio Fabra — Wrestling, Men's Greco-Roman Flyweight

Bronze
Bruno Visintin — Boxing, Men's Light Welterweight
Raffaello Gambino, Cesare Rubini, Maurizio Mannelli, Geminio Ognio, Ermenegildo Arena, Renato De Sanzuane, Carlo Peretti, Renato Traiola, Vincenzo Polito, Salvatore Gionta and Lucio Ceccarini — Water Polo, Men's Team Competition
Antonio Maspes and Cesare Pinarello — Cycling, Men's 2.000m Tandem
Manlio di Rosa — Fencing, Men's Foil Individual

Athletics

Results

Basketball

Men's Team Competition
Qualification Round (Group C)
 Lost to Canada (57-68)
 Defeated Turkey (49-37)
 Defeated Romania (53-39)
 Lost to Egypt (62-66) → did not advance, 17th place

Boxing

Canoeing

Cycling

Road Competition
Men's Individual Road Race (190.4 km)
Dino Bruni — 5:10:54.0 (→ 5th place)
Vincenzo Zucconelli — 5:11:16.5 (→ 6th place)
Gianni Ghidini — 5:11:16.8 (→ 7th place)
Bruno Monti — 5:11:35.0 (→ 15th place)

Track Competition
Men's 1.000m Time Trial
Marino Morettini
 Final — 1:12.7 (→  Silver Medal)

Men's 1.000m Sprint Scratch Race
Enzo Sacchi —  Gold Medal

Men's 4.000m Team Pursuit
Guido Messina, Loris Campana, Marino Morettini, and Mino de Rossi  
 Final — defeated South Africa (→  Gold Medal)

Diving

Men's 3m Springboard
Lamberto Mari
 Preliminary Round — 54.42 points (→ 32nd place)

Equestrian

Fencing

18 fencers, 15 men and 3 women, represented Italy in 1952.

Men's foil
 Edoardo Mangiarotti
 Manlio Di Rosa
 Giancarlo Bergamini

Men's team foil
 Edoardo Mangiarotti, Manlio Di Rosa, Giancarlo Bergamini, Antonio Spallino, Giorgio Pellini, Renzo Nostini

Men's épée
 Edoardo Mangiarotti
 Dario Mangiarotti
 Carlo Pavesi

Men's team épée
 Edoardo Mangiarotti, Dario Mangiarotti, Giuseppe Delfino, Carlo Pavesi, Franco Bertinetti, Roberto Battaglia

Men's sabre
 Gastone Darè
 Vincenzo Pinton
 Renzo Nostini

Men's team sabre
 Vincenzo Pinton, Renzo Nostini, Gastone Darè, Mauro Racca, Roberto Ferrari, Giorgio Pellini

Women's foil
 Irene Camber-Corno
 Silvia Strukel
 Velleda Cesari

Football

Men's Team Competition
Team Roster
 (1.)   Ottavio Bugatti
 (2.)   Giuseppe Corradi
 (3.)   Amos Cardarelli
 (4.)   Maino Neri
 (5.)   Giovanni Azzini
 (6.)   Arcadio Venturi
 (7.)   Giampiero Boniperti
 (8.)   Egisto Pandolfini
 (9.)   Pasquale Vivolo
(10.) Aredio Gimona
(11.) Francesco La Rosa
(12.) Anselmo Giorcelli
(13.) Amos Mariani
(14.) Giancarlo Cadé
(15.) Battista Rota
(16.) Giovani Capurro
(17.) Alberto Fontanesi
(18.) Corrado Viciani
(19.) Rino Ferrario
(20.) Roberto Lovati

Gymnastics

Men's team competition
Team Roster
Fabio Bonacina
Silvio Brivio
Arrigo Carnoli
Guido Figone
Orlando Polmonari
Littorio Sampieri
Quinto Vadi
Luigi Zanetti

Women's team competition
Team Roster
Renata Bianchi
Grazia Bozzo
Miranda Cicognani
Elisabetta Durelli
Licia Macchini
Lidia Pitteri
Luciana Reali
Liliana Scaricabarozzi

Hockey

Modern pentathlon

Three male pentathletes represented Italy in 1952.

Individual
 Alfonso Marotta
 Duilio Brignetti
 Giulio Palmonella

Team
 Alfonso Marotta
 Duilio Brignetti
 Giulio Palmonella

Rowing

Italy had 26 male rowers participate in all seven rowing events in 1952.

 Men's single sculls
 Ugo Pifferi

 Men's double sculls
 Silvio Bergamini
 Lodovico Sommaruga

 Men's coxless pair
 Bruno Gamba
 Antonio Saverio

 Men's coxed pair
 Giuseppe Ramani
 Aldo Tarlao
 Luciano Marion (cox)

 Men's coxless four
 Giuseppe Moioli
 Elio Morille
 Giovanni Invernizzi
 Franco Faggi

 Men's coxed four
 Albino Trevisan
 Amadeo Scarpi
 Abbondio Smerghetto
 Tarquinio Angiolin
 Domenico Cambieri (cox)

 Men's eight
 Albino Baldan
 Savino Dalla Puppa
 Alberto Bozzato
 Ferdinando Smerghetto
 Montanino Nuvoli
 Dino Nardin
 Ottorino Enzo
 Pier Nicola Attorese
 Sergio Ghiatto (cox)

Sailing

Shooting

Eight shooters represented Italy in 1952.

25 m pistol
 Giorgio Pennacchietti
 Michelangelo Borriello

50 m pistol
 Luciano Galesi
 Renato Sacchi

100m running deer
 Luigi Ruspoli
 Ladislao Odescalchi

Trap
 Galliano Rossini
 Italo Bellini

Swimming

Water polo

Men's Team Competition
Team Roster
Ermenegildo Arena
Lucio Ceccarini
Renato De Sanzuane
Raffaello Gambino
Salvatore Gionta
Maurizio Mannelli
Germinio Ognio
Carlo Peretti
Vincenzo Polito
Cesare Rubini
Renato Traiolo

Weightlifting

Wrestling

References

External links
Official Olympic Reports
International Olympic Committee results database
 

Nations at the 1952 Summer Olympics
1952
1952 in Italian sport